Fremont County is a county located in the U.S. state of Idaho. As of the 2020 census the county had a population of 13,388. The county seat and largest city is St. Anthony. The county was established in 1893, and was named for the explorer John C. Frémont. Fremont County is part of the Rexburg, Idaho micropolitan area, which is also included in the Idaho Falls metropolitan area.

History
Fremont County was established in 1893 when Bingham County was partitioned. It is named for John C. Frémont.

The county initially contained all of the northern portion of eastern Idaho north of Bonneville County. The counties of Jefferson and Madison were created from Fremont in 1913. Teton County was later created from Madison in 1915 and a portion of Butte was created from Jefferson in 1917. Clark County was also created from Fremont in 1919.

The first fur trapping operation by a United States fur company west of the Rocky Mountains occurred in 1810 when Andrew Henry established a fort in the fall of 1810 on Conant Creek in southern Fremont County. Henry later moved the fort to the south bank of the Henry's Fork of the Snake River between present-day settlements of Salem and Parker. The fort was abandoned some time after 1811.

At the time of early settlement, Fremont County was located on the northern edge of Oneida County. Mining, timber, and ranching operations commenced in the Island Park area prior to 1870. The establishment of Yellowstone National Park in 1872 also contributed to the eventual development of the Island Park area as a popular recreation area. Construction of the Egin Canal commenced in 1879 and farming settlement of the Egin area followed. In 1883, Parker was established and settlement commenced at Teton. These settlements became part of Bingham County when it was created in 1885. Settlement at St. Anthony started in 1888 while the Ashton area settlement of Marysville commenced settlement in 1889. At the 1890 Census, Bingham County enumerated 301 residents in the precincts of Teton and Henry's Lake.

Additional settlement occurred at Warm River in 1896, the Drummond area in 1900, and Newdale in 1914. 

The Fremont County Courthouse in St. Anthony is on the National Register of Historic Places.

Geography
The southern part of the county cover the northeast tip of the Snake River Basin, with the mountains of the continental divide forming its northern boundary. Montana lies to the north, and Wyoming to the east. A portion of Yellowstone National Park reaches into the county.

Adjacent Counties

 Clark County - west
 Jefferson County - southwest
 Madison County - south
 Teton County - south
 Teton County, Wyoming - east
 Gallatin County, Montana - north
 Madison County, Montana - north
 Beaverhead County, Montana - northwest

Fremont County is one of the few US counties to border two counties of the same name in different states. Fremont County borders two such pairs of counties-- Madison County, Idaho and Madison County, Montana and Teton County, Idaho and Teton County, Wyoming.

Major highways
 US 20
 SH-47
 SH-87

National protected areas
 Caribou-Targhee National Forest (part)
 Yellowstone National Park (part)

Demographics

2000 census
As of the census of 2000, there were 11,819 people, 3,885 households, and 3,030 families living in the county. The population density was 6 people per square mile (2/km2). There were 6,890 housing units at an average density of 4 per square mile (1/km2). The racial makeup of the county was 91.41% White, 0.16% Black or African American, 0.51% Native American, 0.36% Asian, 0.06% Pacific Islander, 5.94% from other races, and 1.56% from two or more races. 10.62% of the population were Hispanic or Latino of any race. 25.1% were of English, 15.1% German and 14.8% American ancestry. Those citing "American" ancestry in Fremont County are of overwhelmingly English extraction, however most English Americans identify simply as having American ancestry because their roots have been in North America for so long, in some cases since the 1600s.

There were 3,885 households, out of which 39.50% had children under the age of 18 living with them, 67.90% were married couples living together, 6.90% had a female householder with no husband present, and 22.00% were non-families. 19.50% of all households were made up of individuals, and 8.50% had someone living alone who was 65 years of age or older. The average household size was 2.96 and the average family size was 3.43.

In the county, the population was spread out, with 33.10% under the age of 18, 9.30% from 18 to 24, 24.70% from 25 to 44, 20.40% from 45 to 64, and 12.40% who were 65 years of age or older. The median age was 32 years. For every 100 females, there were 105.80 males. For every 100 females age 18 and over, there were 105.80 males.

The median income for a household in the county was $33,424, and the median income for a family was $36,715. Males had a median income of $26,490 versus $19,670 for females. The per capita income for the county was $13,965. About 10.30% of families and 14.20% of the population were below the poverty line, including 18.40% of those under age 18 and 13.60% of those age 65 or over.

2010 census
As of the 2010 United States Census, there were 13,242 people, 4,436 households, and 3,436 families living in the county. The racial makeup of the county was 89.5% white, 0.7% American Indian, 0.3% black or African American, 0.2% Asian, 0.1% Pacific islander, 7.6% from other races, and 1.5% from two or more races. Those of Hispanic or Latino origin made up 12.8% of the population. In terms of ancestry, 29.9% were English, 22.7% were German, 7.6% were Irish, 6.1% were American, 5.7% were Scottish, and 5.1% were Danish.

Of the 4,436 households, 38.7% had children under the age of 18 living with them, 65.9% were married couples living together, 7.2% had a female householder with no husband present, 22.5% were non-families, and 19.7% of all households were made up of individuals. The average household size was 2.88 and the average family size was 3.32. The median age was 33.5 years.

The median income for a household in the county was $42,523 and the median income for a family was $52,510. Males had a median income of $35,907 versus $24,450 for females. The per capita income for the county was $18,616. About 6.8% of families and 8.5% of the population were below the poverty line, including 9.3% of those under age 18 and 9.7% of those age 65 or over.

Government and infrastructure
The Idaho Department of Correction operates the St. Anthony Work Camp in St. Anthony.

This rural healthcare system has several health clinics in the county with Madison Memorial as the nearest medical hospital with a trauma center for emergencies. Fremont consistently ranks above average for air quality scores.

Like almost all of Idaho, Fremont County is overwhelmingly Republican. Lyndon B. Johnson in 1964 was the last Democratic presidential candidate to carry it, and even then by only 25 votes. To date, LBJ is the last Democrat to cross 40 percent of the county's vote, and no Democrat has won more than 30 percent of the county’s vote since Jimmy Carter in 1976. In fact, third-party candidates outpolled the Democratic nominee in 1972, 1992 and 2016.

Communities

Cities

Ashton
Drummond
Island Park
Newdale
Parker
St. Anthony
Teton
Warm River

Unincorporated communities

Big Springs
Chester
Egin
Lake
Macks Inn
Squirrel
Wilford

Notable people
 Brad Harris, television and movie actor
 Sherman P. Lloyd, Utah State Senator and Member of the United States House of Representatives from Utah

See also
National Register of Historic Places listings in Fremont County, Idaho

References

External links
County website
Fremont County Joint School District 215 

 
Idaho counties
Populated places established in 1893
Rexburg, Idaho micropolitan area
1893 establishments in Idaho